A list of films produced in the United Kingdom in 1967 (see 1967 in film):

1967

See also
1967 in British music
1967 in British radio
1967 in British television
1967 in the United Kingdom

References

External links

1967
Films
British